This is a list of the National Register of Historic Places listings in Cottle County, Texas.

This is intended to be a complete list of properties and districts listed on the National Register of Historic Places in Cottle County, Texas. There is one district listed on the National Register in the county. The district includes one property that is both a State Antiquities Landmark and a Recorded Texas Historic Landmark.

Current listings

The locations of National Register properties and districts may be seen in a mapping service provided.

|}

See also

National Register of Historic Places listings in Texas
Recorded Texas Historic Landmarks in Cottle County

References

External links

Cottle County, Texas
Cottle County
Buildings and structures in Cottle County, Texas